Earth to America may refer to:

 Earth to America (album), 2006 album by Widespread Panic
 Earth to America (film), a 2005 TV show to raise awareness of environmental issues